Antje Weisgerber (17 April 1922 – 28 September 2004) was a German film and television actress and the wife of actor Horst Caspar.

Selected filmography
 The White Hell of Pitz Palu (1950)
 Two Times Lotte (1950)
 The Stronger Woman (1953)
 Captain Wronski (1954)
 Before God and Man (1955)
 The Ambassador's Wife (1955)
 San Salvatore (1956)
 Melody of the Heart (1956)
 Melody of the Heath (1956)
 The Man Who Sold Himself (1959)
 Stage Fright (1960)
 The Oil Prince (1965)
 As You Like It (1970)

References

External links

1922 births
2004 deaths
Actors from Königsberg
People from East Prussia
German film actresses
German television actresses
20th-century German actresses